Salvia pauciflora is a perennial plant that is native to Yunnan province in China, growing in and around forests at  elevation. It grows on 2–4 slender unbranched stems with widely spaced leaves.

The specific epithet pauciflora is Latin for 'few-flowered'.

References

pauciflora
Flora of China